Velika Škola Building  is located in Belgrade, at 22 Gospodar Jevremova Street, as a building significant for the beginning of the high education in Serbia, as well as for famous historical persons who lived in it, it was declared a cultural monument.

The Architecture
Velika Škola Building, also known as the Velika Škola (College) of Ivan Jugović, consists of two ground- floor buildings, one in the courtyard, erected in the period between 1789 and 1804 and the one turned towards the street, erected in 1862, which in the later additional constructions were merged into one single architectural whole.
The building in which the school was placed was built as a typical Turkish residential house, probably surrounded by a garden. It was built in timber frame with brick filling. It had a two-gabled roof covered in tiles, at least during the time since it was possible to track it through the visual sources. There was a cellar underneath one part of the building, whereas the other part was joined with the adjacent building whose construction began in 1933 on the same lot and of the same owner. The building where the Velika Škola was placed underwent a lot of changes, but still managed to preserve its original characteristics, form and disposition. The first change was done in the period from 1858 to 1864. The most radical change happened in the period from 1960 to 1962. The original entrance was masked with the wall, the roof line was straighten, the levelling of the courtyard was done, and the building was completely "adapted" for the modern living.

In the courtyard building on 30 September 1808, Dositej Obradović delivered a ceremonial speech, and with the presence of the chairman and the members of Praviteljstvujušči sovjet, Velika Škola (The College), was opened, as the first educational institution of that kind in Serbia. In 1809 Velika Škola was transferred to the building of the present Museum of Vuk and Dositej, and the original building was given to Ivan Jugović, the first lecturer and a principal of the Velika Škola, whose activity is related to the work of Praviteljstvujušči sovjet and to the work of first high education institution in Belgrade and in Serbia.

See more 
 University of Belgrade
 Cultural Heritage of Serbia

References

Literature 

B.А.Batalaka, The History of the First Serbian Uprising, Belgrade 1989.
V. Grujić. The Higher Education in Serbia for the first seven decades of the 19th century, XIV, 1967.

External links 

 
Republic Institute for protection of cultural monuments – Belgrade
 Republic Institute for protection of cultural monuments – Belgrade/Database of immovable cultural property
List of monuments

Protected Monuments of Culture
Buildings and structures in Belgrade
Education in Serbia